U2 small nuclear ribonucleoprotein auxiliary factor 35 kDa subunit-related protein 1 is a protein that in humans is encoded by the ZRSR1 gene.

References

Further reading 

 
 
 
 
 
 

Proteins